The Mercatus Center is an American libertarian, free-market-oriented non-profit think tank. Located at George Mason University and directed by the American economist Tyler Cowen, the Mercatus Center works with policy experts, lobbyists, and government officials to connect academic learning and real-world practice. Taking its name from the Latin word for market, the center advocates free-market approaches to public policy. During the George W. Bush administration's campaign to reduce government regulation, The Wall Street Journal reported, "14 of the 23 rules the White House chose for its 'hit list' to eliminate or modify were Mercatus entries".

According to the 2017 Global Go To Think Tank Index Report (Think Tanks and Civil Societies Program, University of Pennsylvania), Mercatus is number 39 in the "Top Think Tanks in the United States" and number 18 of the "Best University Affiliated Think Tanks". The Koch family has been a major financial supporter of the organization since the mid-1980s. Charles Koch serves on the group's board of directors.

History
The Mercatus Center was founded by Richard Fink as the Center for the Study of Market Processes at Rutgers University. After the Koch family gave more than $30 million to George Mason University, the Center moved there in the mid-1980s. It took its current name in 1999.

The Mercatus Center is a 501(c)(3) non-profit and does not receive support from George Mason University or any federal, state, or local governments.

Mission
The organization describes itself as "the world's premier university source for market-oriented ideas" and says it aims to bridge "the gap between academic ideas and real-world problems." By advancing knowledge about how markets can work to improve lives and individual freedoms, by training graduate students, conducting research, and applying economic principles, they hope to offer solutions to society's most pressing problems.

Mercatus currently runs the following research programs: The Project for the Study of American Capitalism; Technology Policy Project; State and Local Policy Project; Spending and Budget Initiative; Program on the American Economy and Globalization; Program on Monetary Policy; Program on Financial Regulation; and Program for Economic Research on Regulation.

Rob Stein, a Democratic strategist, has called Mercatus "ground zero for deregulation policy in Washington." The Wall Street Journal has called the Mercatus Center "the most important think tank you've never heard of".

Activities
In 2018, Mercatus announced that it "sponsored the development of a futures market based on [nominal gross domestic product] contracts with Hypermind, a UK-based prediction market." As explained in the announcement: "Mercatus Center's Scott Sumner and David Beckworth have made the case that an alternative monetary policy approach, nominal gross domestic product (NGDP) level targeting, is superior to inflation targeting. NGDP is essentially the nation's total income. According to Sumner and Beckworth, instead of targeting inflation (general prices), the Federal Reserve's monetary policy should target the rate at which the nation's total income is expected to grow. NGDP level targeting will ensure that the right amount of money supply is provided to meet the economy's needs."

In 2016, Mercatus launched its Program on the American Economy and Globalization, run by Daniel Griswold, which aims to help "the public and policymakers understand the benefits of an economy free from protectionist barriers against the international movement of goods, services, capital, ideas, and people."

In 2015, Mercatus launched its annual Ranking of the 50 States by Fiscal Conditions.

Also in 2015, Mercatus started its Program on Monetary Policy.

In 2012, Mercatus scholar Charles Blahous released a study saying that the Patient Protection and Affordable Care Act (PPACA) would worsen the federal deficit, contrary to the official Congressional Budget Office forecast. The study was generally criticized by supporters of the PPACA. Jeanne Lambrew, deputy assistant to the president for health policy, wrote, "This new math fits the old pattern of mischaracterizations about the Affordable Care Act when official estimates show the health care law reduces the deficit." Blahous defended the findings of his research.

In 2010, the center collaborated with EconStories to produce a parody rap video about the conflict of ideas between F. A. Hayek and John Maynard Keynes. A sequel, "Fight of the Century", was produced in 2011.

In 2001, the Office of Management and Budget asked for public input on which regulations should be revised or killed. Mercatus submitted 44 of the 71 proposals the OMB received.

Organizational structure
The Mercatus Center is located on George Mason University's Arlington Campus, and is affiliated with GMU's Economics department. The Provost of George Mason University has the power to appoint a faculty director to head the Mercatus Center.

Board of directors
Members of the Board of Directors include:
 Donald J. Boudreaux, economist and professor
 Emily Chamlee-Wright, president and CEO of the Institute for Humane Studies
 Salen Churi, co-founder of Trust Ventures
 Richard Fink, former executive vice president of Koch Industries
 Brian Hooks, CEO and chairman of Stand Together
 Manuel H. Johnson, economist
 Charles G. Koch, co-owner, chairman and CEO of Koch Industries
 Edwin Meese, 75th United States Attorney General (1985–1988)
 Vernon L. Smith, 2002 winner of the Nobel Memorial Prize in Economic Sciences

Publications
Scholars affiliated with the Mercatus Center have published hundreds of journal articles and research papers, with topics including government transparency, subsidies, taxation, regulation, corruption, and Austrian School economics. They have also provided more than 100 testimonies to Congress. Notable studies performed and books published include:
 "Tyranny Comes Home," published in 2018, assesses how, under certain conditions, U.S. policies, tactics, and technologies deployed abroad via military interventions "are re-imported to America, changing the national landscape and increasing the extent to which we live in a police state." The authors "examine this pattern―which they dub 'the boomerang effect'―considering a variety of rich cases that include the rise of state surveillance, the militarization of domestic law enforcement, the expanding use of drones, and torture in U.S. prisons."
 "Permissionless Innovation," a book by scholar Adam Thierer, which argues that if "the precautionary principle," trumps "permissionless innovation" with regards to government's approach to technological innovation, then "the result will be fewer services, lower-quality goods, higher prices, diminished economic growth, and a decline in the overall standard of living."
 "How Are Small Banks Faring under Dodd-Frank?," a 2015 survey of approximately 200 small U.S. banks serving mostly rural and small metropolitan markets. The survey "included questions about specific regulatory and compliance activities, interactions with regulators, effects of particular regulations, changes in fees and revenue, and business strategy decisions since the passage of Dodd–Frank."
 "Annual Performance Report Scorecard" (2000–2009): Produced by the Mercatus Center's Government Accountability Project, these publications assess the annual reports released by the 24 federal agencies covered by the Chief Financial Officers Act. The reports, required by the Government Performance and Results Act of 1993 are rated for their demonstration of "transparency, public benefits, and leadership." The most recent publication, covering the 2008 fiscal year, ranked the reports from Labor, Veterans Affairs, and Transportation departments as the best, and those from SBA, Defense, and HUD as the worst. Only 13 of the departments' reports received a "satisfactory" score in this 2009 publication, which notes that agencies "whose policy views were evaluated as more liberal ... seem to score slightly better."
 "Freedom in the 50 States: An Index of Personal and Economic Freedom" ranks states according to how well they meet the Center's ideals of personal and economic freedom. The 2011 rankings regarded New Hampshire, South Dakota, and Indiana as the freest, and New York, New Jersey, and California as the most restrictive. The 2013 rankings regarded North Dakota, South Dakota, and Tennessee as the freest, and New York, California, and New Jersey as the most restrictive. This index was later transferred to the Cato Institute.

Scholars
Notable scholars at Mercatus include:
 Charles Blahous
 Peter Boettke
 Donald J. Boudreaux
 Bryan Caplan
 Tyler Cowen
 Christopher Coyne
 Steven Horwitz
 Arnold Kling
 Peter Leeson
 Maurice McTigue
 Russ Roberts
 Scott Sumner
 Alex Tabarrok
 Lawrence H. White
 Bruce Yandle
 Todd Zywicki

Alumni 
Notable former Mercatus scholars, students, and employees include:
 Brian Blase, former Special Assistant to the President for Healthcare Policy
 Susan Dudley
 Hester Peirce

See also
 Good Government Organizations (United States)

References

External links
 
 EDIRC listing (provided by RePEc)
 Organizational Profile – National Center for Charitable Statistics (Urban Institute)

 
George Mason University
Political and economic think tanks in the United States
Libertarian think tanks
Libertarian organizations based in the United States
Rutgers University
Koch family
Organizations established in 1980
1980 establishments in New Jersey
Non-profit organizations based in Arlington, Virginia
Conservative organizations in the United States